Pravastatin, sold under the brand name Pravachol among others, is a statin medication, used for preventing cardiovascular disease in those at high risk and treating abnormal lipids. It should be used together with diet changes, exercise, and weight loss. It is taken by mouth.

Common side effects include joint pain, diarrhea, nausea, headaches, and muscle pains. Serious side effects may include rhabdomyolysis, liver problems, and diabetes. Use during pregnancy may harm the fetus. Like all statins, pravastatin works by inhibiting HMG-CoA reductase, an enzyme found in liver that plays a role in producing cholesterol.

Pravastatin was patented in 1980 and approved for medical use in 1989. It is on the World Health Organization's List of Essential Medicines. It is available as a generic medication. In 2020, it was the 34th most commonly prescribed medication in the United States, with more than 17million prescriptions.

Medical uses
Pravastatin is primarily used for the treatment of dyslipidemia and the prevention of cardiovascular disease. It is recommended to be used only after other measures, such as diet, exercise, and weight reduction, have not improved cholesterol levels.

The evidence for the use of pravastatin is generally weaker than for other statins. The antihypertensive and lipid-lowering treatment to prevent heart attack trial (ALLHAT), failed to demonstrate a difference in all-cause mortality or nonfatal myocardial infarction/fatal coronary heart disease rates between patients receiving pravastatin 40 mg daily (a common starting dose) and those receiving usual care.

Adverse effects and contraindications
Pravastatin has undergone over 112,000 patient-years of double-blind, randomized trials using the 40 mg, once-daily dose and placebos. These trials indicate pravastatin is well tolerated and displays few noncardiovascular abnormalities in patients.  However, side effects may occur. A doctor should be consulted if symptoms such as heartburn or headache are severe and do not go away.

These uncommon side effects should be promptly reported to the prescribing doctor or an emergency medical service:
 muscle pain, tenderness, or weakness
 lack of energy
 fever
 jaundice, yellowing of the skin or eyes
 pain in the upper right part of the stomach
 nausea
 extreme tiredness
 unusual bleeding or bruising
 dark-colored urine
 loss of appetite
 flu-like symptoms
 rash
 hives
 itching
 difficulty breathing or swallowing
 swelling of the face, throat, tongue, lips, eyes, hands, feet, ankles, or lower legs
 hoarseness

These symptoms should be reported to the prescribing doctor if they persist or increase in severity:
 heartburn
 headache
 memory loss or forgetfulness
 confusion

Contraindications, conditions that warrant withholding treatment with pravastatin, include pregnancy and breastfeeding. Taking pravastatin while pregnant could lead to birth defects. While the amount of pravastatin ingested by an infant from breastfeeding is low, patients breastfeeding should not take pravastatin due to potential effects on the infant's lipid metabolism.

Drug interactions
Medications that should not be taken with pravastatin include, but are not limited to:
 Cimetidine (Tagamet) 
 Colchicine (Colcrys)
 Cyclosporine (Neoral, Sandimmune)
 Ketoconazole (Nizoral)
 Additional cholesterol-lowering medications such as: fenofibrate (Tricor), gemfibrozil (Lopid), cholestyramine (Questran, Questran Light, Cholybar), and niacin (nicotinic acid, Niacor, Niaspan);
 Specific HIV protease inhibitors such as: lopinavir and ritonavir (Kaletra), and ritonavir (Norvir) taken with darunavir (Prezista); and spironolactone (Aldactone).

Pravastatin is cleared by the kidneys, giving it a distinct advantage over other statins when a potential for drug interactions using the hepatic pathway exists.

The combination of fenofibrate with pravastatin is approved for use in the European Union.

Mechanism of action
Pravastatin acts as a lipoprotein-lowering drug through two pathways. In the major pathway, pravastatin inhibits the function of hydroxymethylglutaryl-CoA (HMG-CoA) reductase. As a reversible competitive inhibitor, pravastatin sterically hinders the action of HMG-CoA reductase by occupying the active site of the enzyme. Taking place primarily in the liver, this enzyme is responsible for the conversion of HMG-CoA to mevalonate in the rate-limiting step of the biosynthetic pathway for cholesterol. Pravastatin also inhibits the synthesis of very-low-density lipoproteins, which are the precursor to low-density lipoproteins (LDL). These reductions increase the number of cellular LDL receptors, thus LDL uptake increases, removing it from the bloodstream. Overall, the result is a reduction in circulating cholesterol and LDL. A minor reduction in triglycerides and an increase in high-density lipoproteins (HDL) are common.

History
Initially known as CS-514, pravastatin is a derivative of ML236B (compactin), which was identified in a fungus called Penicillium citrinum in the 1970s by researchers of the Sankyo Pharma Inc.  It is being marketed outside Japan by the pharmaceutical company Bristol-Myers Squibb. In 2005, Pravachol was the 22nd-highest selling brand-name drug in the United States, with sales totaling $1.3 billion.

The Food and Drug Administration (FDA) approved generic pravastatin for use in the United States on 24 April 2006. Generic pravastatin sodium tablets were manufactured by Biocon Ltd, India and TEVA Pharmaceuticals in Kfar Sava, Israel.

References

External links 
 
 

Statins
Bristol Myers Squibb
Daiichi Sankyo
Diols
Carboxylic acids
Carboxylate esters
Bicyclic compounds
Beta hydroxy acids
Wikipedia medicine articles ready to translate